Fritz W. Alexander II (April 24, 1926 – April 22, 2000) was an American judge who served as an Associate Judge of the New York Court of Appeals from 1985 to 1992, and a deputy mayor of New York from 1992 to 1993. Alexander was the first black judge to serve a full term on the Court of Appeals. Fritz Alexander was a part of the Harlem Clubhouse headed by J. Raymond Jones

He died of cancer on April 22, 2000, in Manhattan at age 73.

See Also
Harlem Clubhouse

Further reading
John C. Walker,The Harlem Fox: J. Raymond Jones at Tammany 1920:1970, New York: State University  New York Press, 1989.
David N. Dinkins, A Mayor's Life: Governing New York's Gorgeous Mosaic, PublicAffairs Books, 2013
Rangel, Charles B.; Wynter, Leon. And I Haven't Had a Bad Day Since: From the Streets of Harlem to the Halls of Congress. New York: St. Martin's Press, 2007
Paterson, David Black, Blind, & In Charge: A Story of Visionary Leadership and Overcoming Adversity. New York, New York, 2020
Baker Motley, Constance Equal Justice Under The Law: An Autobiography, New York: Farrar, Straus, and Giroux, 1998
Howell, Ron Boss of Black Brooklyn: The Life and Times of Bertram L. Baker  Fordham University Press Bronx, New York, 2018
Jack, Hulan Fifty Years a Democrat:The Autobiography of Hulan Jack New Benjamin Franklin House New York, NY, 1983
Clayton-Powell, Adam Adam by Adam:The Autobiography of Adam Clayton Powell Jr. New York, New York, 1972
Pritchett, Wendell E. Robert Clifton Weaver and the American City: The Life and Times of an Urban Reformer Chicago: University of Chicago Press, 2008
Davis, Benjamin Communist Councilman from Harlem:Autobiographical Notes Written in a Federal Penitentiary New York, New York, 1969

References

1926 births
2000 deaths
Judges of the New York Court of Appeals
New York (state) Democrats
Deaths from cancer in New York (state)
20th-century American judges